Cartwright Township is located in Sangamon County, Illinois. As of the 2010 census, its population was 1,482 and it contained 615 housing units.  The township is named after pioneer missionary and Methodist minister Peter Cartwright, who lived in the township and is buried there. A United Methodist congregation within the limits of Pleasant Plains also bears his name. The most populated area of Cartwright Township is the town of Pleasant Plains, Illinois. Pleasant Plains has approximately 800 residents within its boundaries. The rest of the township is dotted with farmsteads and crop fields. Cartwright Township is known for its rich, fertile land and its agricultural roots. It is also the original home of Brandt Professional Agriculture now located in Springfield, IL. Brandts is a worldwide corporation that was a pioneer in agricultural fertilizer and is still the leader today.

As well as Pleasant Plains, Cartwright Township is also the home of Clayville, Illinois, an Illinois frontier ghost town (1824).  The former settlement's brick tavern has been preserved by the township historical society.

Geography

Demographics

References

External links
City-data.com
Illinois State Archives
Brandt

Townships in Sangamon County, Illinois
Springfield metropolitan area, Illinois
Townships in Illinois